Tuba Hassan (born 18 October 2000) is a Pakistani cricketer who plays as a right-arm leg break bowler.

In January 2022, she was named as a reserve player in Pakistan's squad for the 2022 Women's Cricket World Cup. In May 2022, she was named in both the Women's Twenty20 International (WT20I) and Women's One Day International (WODI) squads for Sri Lanka's tour of Pakistan.

International career  
Hassan made her international debut in the first WT20I on 24 May 2022, in which she took the best bowling figures for a Pakistani debutant, with 3/8 from her four overs. Later the same month, she was named in Pakistan's team for the cricket tournament at the 2022 Commonwealth Games in Birmingham, England. Following her performance on her debut, she won the ICC Women's Player of the Month award, becoming the first women from the Pakistan team to win it. In July 2022, the Pakistan Cricket Board (PCB) awarded her with her first central contract.

Hassan made her ODI debut against Australia on 21 January 2023.

References

External links
 
 

2000 births
Living people
Cricketers from Lahore
Pakistani women cricketers
Pakistan women Twenty20 International cricketers
Pakistan women One Day International cricketers
Lahore women cricketers
Higher Education Commission women cricketers
Cricketers at the 2022 Commonwealth Games
Commonwealth Games competitors for Pakistan